A number of motor vessels have been named Explorer, including -

 , a Norwegian, Panamanian and Liberian-flagged cruise ship which sank off the coast of Antarctica in 2007.
 , a Bahamas-flagged passenger ship in service since 2004.
 , a cruise ship now called .

See also
 Explorer (disambiguation) for other ships named "Explorer" or with "Explorer" in their name.
 , two ships with this name.
 , cruise ship
 , a steam trawler on the National Historic Ships register.

Ship names